Ian Bell is a cricketer who represents the England cricket team. He has scored centuries (100 or more runs in a single innings) in Test and One Day International (ODI) matches on 22 and 4 occasions respectively. As of November 2015, he has played 118 Tests and 161 ODIs for England, scoring 7,727 and 5,416 runs respectively.

Bell made his Test debut in 2004 in the fourth Test against the West Indies at The Oval, scoring 70 in a ten-wicket England victory. His first century came a year later against Bangladesh at the Riverside Ground, Chester-le-Street. His highest Test score is 235 against India at The Oval. Bell has scored Test centuries at fifteen cricket grounds, including seven at venues outside England. He has scored his twenty-two Test centuries against eight different opponents; he is most successful against Australia, Pakistan and India, with four against each. England have never lost a test match in which Bell has scored a century. His dismissal for 199 against South Africa in July 2008 made him just the seventh batsman to lose his wicket on that score in Test cricket.  As of November 2015, Bell is joint twenty-eighth among all-time Test century makers, and joint third in the equivalent list for England.

Bell's ODI debut came in 2004 against Zimbabwe at the Harare Sports Club, a match England won by five wickets. He scored 75 runs in the match, and received the man of the match award. His first century came three years later at the Rose Bowl, Southampton, scoring an unbeaten 126 in a 104-run victory over India. His highest ODI score is 141 against Australia at the Bellerive Oval, Hobart in 2015. Following the conclusion of the 2015 Ashes series, Bell announced his retirement from ODI cricket.

Bell has played eight Twenty20 International (T20I) matches, without scoring a century, his highest score being 60 not out. As of 2015, Bell is joint forty-sixth—with Garfield Sobers, Marcus Trescothick and David Boon—in the list of century-makers in international cricket, all formats of the game combined.

Key

Test cricket centuries

One Day International centuries

Notes

A.  Bell is joint twenty-eighth in all-time Test century makers along with Wally Hammond,  Mohammad Azharuddin, Colin Cowdrey and Geoffrey Boycott.

References

General

Specific

External links
 

Bell
Bell, Ian